Jordan Minor (born March 11, 2000) is an American college basketball player for the Merrimack Warriors of the Northeast Conference (NEC).

High school career
Minor attended Boston College High School for two seasons before transferring to Brimmer and May School. In April 2019, he committed to play college basketball at  Merrimack, choosing the Warriors over UMass and Brown.

College career
As a freshman, Minor averaged 6.2 points per game. He averaged 12 points, 8.1 rebounds, and 1.3 blocks per game as a sophomore and was named to the Third Team All-Northeast Conference. As a junior, Minor averaged 15.1 points and 8.2 rebounds per game, earning Second Team All-NEC honors. He missed six games during his senior season due to an undisclosed injury. Minor was named NEC co-Player of the Year as a senior, alongside Josh Cohen of Saint Francis University.

References

External links
Merrimack Warriors bio

2000 births
Living people
American men's basketball players
Basketball players from Massachusetts
Boston College High School alumni
Merrimack Warriors men's basketball players
Power forwards (basketball)